David J. Eagle is a television director, producer, and screenwriter, best known for his direction of 13 episodes of the science fiction series Babylon 5, including "Severed Dreams", which won the Hugo Award for Best Dramatic Presentation, and the CBS Schoolbreak Special "Kids Killing Kids", for which he received the Outstanding Children's Program Emmy Award as writer, director, and producer.

References

External links
 

Emmy Award winners
Living people
American television directors
1954 births
Hugo Award winners